Joanne Victoria Hartley (born 12 March 1972) is an English actress born in Oldham, Lancashire who has appeared in the films The Young Victoria, Eddie the Eagle, Slaughterhouse Rulez and Torvill & Dean and in British television series This is England, Not Safe For Work, After Life, Bliss, In My Skin, Sweetheart (2021), and Bank of Dave in 2023.

Early life
Hartley was brought up in a working-class family, attending North Chadderton School in Chadderton, in the Metropolitan Borough of Oldham, Greater Manchester, England. She started acting at the age of 11 in her school production of The Sound of Music as Gretel Von Trappe. She then joined Oldham Theatre Workshop, developing her acting skills until the age of 17, when she stopped acting to work at British Aerospace (BAe) on a Youth Training Scheme where she worked as a secretary in the office for two years until leaving BAe to join Japan Airlines as a flight attendant.

In her mid-twenties, Hartley left the aviation industry to pursue a career as an actor.
 Hartley returned to England, in London studying at the Questors Theatre in Ealing, where she studied method acting and Stanislavski's system until landing her first film role in the 2004 Shane Meadows directed Crime Drama Thriller film Dead Man's Shoes as 'Marie'.

Career
Hartley has made appearances in many British productions, including films such as Northern Soul and Me and Her both in 2004; Terra Firma and Flushed in 2008; and The Crossing, Janet and Bernard and I Don't Care in 2014. Hartley has been a character actor in many TV films and TV series since 2004, with her most notable roles in This Is England '86, This Is England '88 and This Is England '90, the follow-on TV mini-series to the film.
In movies Hartley has appeared in This Is England (2006) as Cynthia, and the feature film The Young Victoria in 2009, with Emily Blunt and Rupert Friend.

In 2016 Hartley appeared as Janette, Eddie's mother in the film Eddie the Eagle appearing alongside Taron Egerton and Hugh Jackman. She co-starred in the David Cross series Bliss opposite Heather Graham as one of two partners of a fraudulent travel writer.  Hartley also appeared in the comedy horror film Slaughterhouse Rulez, alongside Asa Butterfield and Simon Pegg.

After a successful pilot episode, Hartley played the role of Bethan's mum `Katrina' who suffers from bipolar disorder in the BBC series In My Skin which aired on BBC1 in 2020. In April 2020, Hartley returned as June in the second series of Ricky Gervais's After Life.

In January 2021, Hartley joined the Rising Star Award jury of the EE British Academy Film Awards to select the shortlist for the 2021 award, alongside Alicia Vikander, Naomi Ackie and several other prominent figures of the industry. In September 2021, Hartley plays the lead character in the British comedy film Swede Caroline, the first for Deadbeat Studios.
In November 2021, Hartley was nominated for the BIFA Award for Best Supporting Actress for her performance as Tina in the Marley Morrison directed British drama film Sweetheart.

In December 2021, Hartley had a guest-role appearance in the BBC's Mandy Christams special — We Wish You A Mandy Christmas alongside Diane Morgan and Johnny Vegas.

In 2023, Hartley starred as 'Nicola', wife of Burnley banker Dave Fishwick (played by Rory Kinnear) in the film Bank of Dave, released on Netflix in January 2023.

Filmography

Film

Television

Awards

References

External links
 Jo Hartley at Contactmusic
 

1972 births
Living people
Actresses from Oldham
People educated at North Chadderton School
21st-century English actresses
English film actresses
English television actresses
Actresses from Lancashire